Duncan John McIntyre (12 December 1841 - 8 September 1920) was an Ontario lawyer and political figure. He represented Victoria South in the Legislative Assembly of Ontario as a Liberal member from 1883 to 1886.

He was born in 1841 on the isle of Tiree, Scotland the son of John McIntyre, and came to Mariposa Township, Canada West in 1847 with his family. McIntyre was called to the bar in 1871. He married Margaret Whiteside in 1873. He died in 1920.

References

External links
The Canadian parliamentary companion, 1885 JA Gemmill

1842 births
1920 deaths
Immigrants to the Province of Canada
Ontario Liberal Party MPPs
Scottish emigrants to pre-Confederation Ontario
Place of death missing